"If You" (Hangul: 있다면; RR: itdamyeon) is the debut single by South Korean boy group special unit NU'EST W, composed of JR, Aron, Baekho and Ren. It was released as a digital single on July 25, 2017, by Pledis Entertainment and distributed by CJ E&M Music.

Release 
The song was released as a digital single on July 25, 2017, through several music portals, including MelOn in South Korea and iTunes globally.

Commercial performance 
"If You" debuted and peaked at number 2 on the Gaon Digital Chart, on the chart issue dated July 23–29, 2017. The song sold 126,434 downloads and accumulated 1,823,780 streams in its first week. In its second week, the song fell to number 11 and to number 22 in its third and final week.

The song entered at number 29 on the Gaon Digital Chart for the month of July 2017, with 143,135 downloads sold.

Track listing

Charts

Release history

References 

Hybe Corporation singles
2017 songs
2017 establishments in South Korea
2017 debut singles